Asian Ethnology is an open access, peer-reviewed journal dedicated to the promotion of research on the peoples and cultures of Asia. It was first published in 1942 at the Catholic University of Peking as Folklore Studies and subsequently at Nanzan University, where from 1963 to 2007 it was known as Asian Folklore Studies.

The journal is indexed in Arts and Humanities Citation Index, Bibliography of Asian Studies, Directory of Open Access Journals, and EBSCO Information Services' Academic Search Complete.

References

External links 
 Journal homepage
 all volumes
 Archive of previous website: 
 JSTOR

Asian folklore
Japanese studies
Works about Asia
Publications established in 1942
English-language journals
Open access journals
1942 establishments in China